Dean Dodds (born in New Zealand) is a New Zealand retired footballer.

Career

In 1998, Dodds signed for Irish club Bohemian along with 3 other New Zealand players. A few months after arrival, he said that the stadiums were larger in Ireland but the medical facilities were better in New Zealand. However,   Dodds was released in December that year due to a change of head coach.

For 2000, he signed for Finnish top flight side Tampere United, making 8 league appearances there.

References

External links
 Dean Dodds at Veikkausliiga

Living people
Association football midfielders
New Zealand association footballers
Tampere United players
Year of birth missing (living people)